Shudhu Tumi is a 2004 Bengali film directed by Abhijit Guha and Sudeshna Roy, produced by Sagar Bhora and Siddhartha Bhora, and starring Prosenjit Chatterjee and Koel Mallick in the lead roles. Zubeen Garg composed the music.

Cast 
 Prosenjit Chatterjee as Rohit
 Koel Mallick as Nandini
 Gargi Roychowdhury as Rani 
 Payel Sarkar as Anjana, Rohit's sister 
 Kalyani Mondal as Rohit's Mother
 Arijit Chowdhury
 Debnath Chattopadhyay
 Dwijen Bandyopadhyay Rohit's Uncle
 Joyjit Banerjee as Rohit's Brother Rahul
 Parthasarathi Deb

Soundtrack 

Music composed by Zubeen Garg. The album contains 8 total tracks except 4 tracks which were reused from Garg's earlier Assamese Films. "Gun Gun Gun Gunjare" reused as "Uth Gutibo Janene" from 2002 Assamese film Kanyadaan, "Shure Shure Gaan Holo" reused "Lahe Lahe Barhise" from 2001 Assamese film Nayak, "E Choker Kachhete" reused "Monore Poduli Dolisa" from 2004 Assamese film Barood and "Sajbe Ebar Koner" reused "Mahadev Keni Gol" from 2003 Original Assamese film Agnisakshi. The Song "Bheeje Bheeje" was later reused as "Apon Buli Jakei" in the Assamese film Adhinayak in 2006.

Track listing

External links

References 

2004 films
2000s Bengali-language films
2004 drama films
Bengali-language Indian films
Films directed by Abhijit Guha and Sudeshna Roy
Indian drama films